Billy Jonas of Asheville, North Carolina is a singer-songwriter, percussionist, and multi-instrumentalist. He works as both a general audience performer and family entertainer. He is a member of Congregation Beth HaTephila, where he trains students for their Bar Mitzvah or Bat Mitzvah, and a part of the Sacred Music Team. As a founding member of the folk music duo, "The Billys," and leader of The Billy Jonas Band, Jonas uses recyclable items as instruments. His show focuses on enlightening audiences about each person’s inherent musical ability, and the musical potential of common “found objects.” Billy Jonas' 7 albums, PBS special, and 2 decades of live concerts have generated a following throughout North America.

He is not related to the popular music band the Jonas Brothers.

Career 
In the 1980s, when attending Oberlin College, Jonas was a founding member of the Oberlin College Big Bang Theory performance art collective. In Chicago, he performed monthly "Bangalong with Billy" shows at the No Exit Cafe, and in the 1990s co-founded the "funky folk" duo The Billys with Bill Melanson. As a member of the duo "The Billys," he was featured at festivals and venues nationwide. Jonas shared stages with Patty Larkin, Ani DiFranco, David Wilcox, Richard Thompson, and Pete Seeger.

Recognition
His CD What Kind of Cat are You? received a First Place/Gold from the American Federation of Independent Musicians and a Parents' Choice Gold Award. Jonas' videos have garnered multiple accolades, including Parents' Choice Awards and a New York Times "Best for Kids" listing. In 2010 Billy Jonas and the Billy Jonas Band were invited to perform at the White House Easter Egg Roll.

Workshops 
Billy conducts workshops that focus on a component of his music. These include “foraged, found, and homemade instruments”, “songwriting”, “performance and presence”, “Neo-tribal hootenanny 101”, “teacher training”, and more.

Discography 
For family audiences:
Build It Back Again (2014)
Happy Accidents (2009)
What Kind of Cat Are You?! (2002)

For general audiences:
habayta (homeward) (2015)
Get Real (2004)
Billy Jonas Live (2002)
Life So Far (2000)
The Time Has Come (as The Billys) (1993)
The Billys (as The Billys) (1991)

DVD/VHS 

 Everybody's in the Band DVD/VHS (2004)

 Bangin' and Sangin' DVD/VHS (2000)

References

External links 
Website

Year of birth missing (living people)
Living people
American folk musicians
American children's musicians
Musicians from Asheville, North Carolina
Jewish American musicians
American male singer-songwriters
Singer-songwriters from North Carolina
Oberlin College alumni